Česká zbrojovka may refer to the following:
 Česká zbrojovka Strakonice
 Česká zbrojovka Uherský Brod
 Česká zbrojovka firearms